This article lists political parties in Melilla.

The parties

Most of the Spanish political parties are active in Melilla. In addition are the following regional parties:

Coalition for Melilla (Coalición por Melilla)
Nationalist Party of the Rif of Melilla (Partido Nacionalista del Rif de Melilla''')
Party of Labour and Progress of Melilla (Partido del Trabajo y el Progeso de Melilla'')

See also
 List of political parties by country

Melilla
 
Melilla